When the Morning Comes is the fourth album from Norwegian singer-songwriter Marit Larsen, and was released on 20 October 2014 in the Nordic countries by Warner Music Norway. On 27 March 2015, Sony Music Germany released the album in Germany, Switzerland and Austria. On 29 January 2016 it was released in the United States.

On 14 July 2014, Marit Larsen made the premiere of the single "I Don't Want to Talk About It" on NRK P3 radio. The single was released on 4 August on iTunes, Google Play, Spotify and WiMP. The accompanying music video was released on her YouTube channel on 6 October.

The re-release of the album by Sony Music Germany has an alternate album cover, and as "Deluxe Edition" 5 additional acoustic live tracks and 1 bonus track. The album produced four singles; "I Don't Want To Talk About It", "Faith & Science", "Please Don't Fall For Me" and "Traveling Alone". It gave Marit 2 number one songs in the Philippine Top 100 Songs Chart. Her non-single song "Before You Fell" managed to chart and stayed atop for 6 consecutive weeks which gave Marit her third number one song in the Philippines then replaced by "Please Don't Fall For Me" stayed atop for 2 non-consecutive weeks and became her fourth number one song in the chart.

Track listing

Charts

References

2014 albums
Marit Larsen albums